Eden Thottam is a 1980 Indian Malayalam film, directed by P. Chandrakumar and produced by M. Mani. The film stars Sukumari, Jayabharathi and M. G. Soman in the lead roles. The film has musical score by Shyam.

Cast
 
Sukumari as Usha's mother
Jayabharathi as Shantha
Sankaradi as Rappai
Sreelatha Namboothiri as Maami Chettathi
Ambika as Usha
KPAC Sunny as Varghese 
M. G. Soman as Thomaskutty
Mala Aravindan as Rajappan
T. P. Madhavan as Thomaskutty's father

Soundtrack
The music was composed by Shyam and the lyrics were written by Sathyan Anthikkad.

References

External links
 

1980 films
1980s Malayalam-language films
Films directed by P. Chandrakumar